Iolaus adorabilis is a butterfly in the family Lycaenidae. It is found in Cameroon and Nigeria.

References

Butterflies described in 2008
Iolaus (butterfly)